Antto is a Finnish given name and nickname. Notable people with the name include:

Antto Hilska (born 1993), Finnish football player
Antto Melasniemi, member of Finnish band HIM
Antto Tapaninen (born 1989), Finnish football player

See also

Anto (name)
Antti
Antton (name)
Atto (disambiguation)

Finnish masculine given names